Ghost Repeater is the third solo album from singer/songwriter Jeffrey Foucault. Produced by Bo Ramsey, Ghost Repeater was released on May 23, 2006, two years after the release of Foucault's previous effort, Stripping Cane. The album represented a notable departure from Foucault's previous records, favoring a rich texture over the sparse nature of Foucault's earlier recordings.

Reception

Ghost Repeater received high praise from critics, with The Chicago Sun-Times hailing it as "One of the best albums of the year." Writing for Minor 7th, music critic David Kleiner wrote of the album "Ghosts haunt the landscape of Jeffrey Foucault’s latest release. He’ll wrap his lusciously deep voice around every achingly beautiful melody ("One Part Love," for one), play good six string, and even write songs that ought to be hits on country radio ("Mesa, Arizona"). And he’ll make the best damn album I’ve heard this year, "Ghost Repeater." Writing for No Depression, music critic Eric R. Danton wrote of the album "... his spare, rootsy tunes are deceptively complex. He’s a skilled observer, shifting easily between general observations about life and startling first-person details, relating both in a tousled voice that resonates with a certain lived-in wisdom... The title track is the real stunner here, though... the homage ties together the threads of blues, folk and country that run through the album."

Track listing
All songs by Jeffrey Foucault.

 "Ghost Repeater" - 5:11
 "Americans in Corduroys" - 4:50
 "I Dream an Old Lover" - 4:14
 "One for Sorrow" - 3:52
 "Train to Jackson" - 4:18
 "One Part Love" - 4:08
 "Wild Waste and Welter" - 5:12
 "City Flower" - 3:38
 "Tall Grass in Old Virginny" - 3:27
 "Mesa, Arizona" - 5:05
 "Appeline" - 3:47

Personnel
 Jeffrey Foucault - acoustic guitar, vocals
 Bo Ramsey - electric guitar, resonator guitar, Weissenborn guitar
 Rick Cicalo - bass, stand up bass
 Steve Hayes - drums, percussion
 Dave Moore - accordion
 Eric Heywood - pedal steel
 Nate Basinger - hammond organ, Wurlitzer
 Kris Delmhorst - vocals
Production notes:
 Produced by Bo Ramsey
 Recorded by John Svec at Minstrel, Iowa City, Iowa
 Assistant Engineering by Lorne Entress and Dirk Freymouth
 Mixed by Tom Tucker, assisted by Danielle Clare
 Mastered by Jim Demain
 Art direction & design - Christian Helms
 Photography by Sandra Dyas

References

External links
 Official Jeffrey Foucault website
Signature Sounds Recordings
Young/Hunter Management

2006 albums
Jeffrey Foucault albums